The 2022 International GT Open was the seventeenth season of the International GT Open, the grand tourer-style sports car racing series founded in 2006 by the Spanish GT Sport Organización. It began on 1 May at the Circuito do Estoril and ended at the Circuit de Barcelona-Catalunya on 16 October after seven rounds of two races each.

Entry List

Race calendar and results 

 A seven-round provisional calendar was revealed on 16 November 2021.

Championship standings

Points systems 

Points are awarded to the top 10 (Pro) or top 6 (Am, Pro-Am, Teams) classified finishers. If less than 6 participants start the race or if less than 75% of the original race distance is completed, half points are awarded. For the Endurance Race (Spa) points are multiplied by 2. At the end of the season, the 2 lowest race scores are dropped; if the points dropped are those obtained in the Endurance race, that will count as 2 races; however, the dropped races cannot be the result of disqualification or race bans.

Overall

Pro-Am, Am, and Teams

Drivers' championships

Overall

References

External links 

 

International GT Open seasons
International GT Open